A reach stacker is a vehicle used for handling intermodal cargo containers in small terminals or medium-sized ports. Reach stackers are able to transport a container short distances very quickly and pile them in various rows depending on its access.

Reach stackers have gained ground in container handling in most markets because of their flexibility and higher stacking and storage capacity when compared to forklift trucks. Using reach stackers, container blocks can be kept 4-deep due to second row access.

There are also empty stackers or empty container handlers that are used only for handling empty containers quickly and efficiently.

Gallery

See also
 Telescopic handler

References

External links

Bulk material handling
Intermodal containers
Port infrastructure
Articles containing video clips